Johann Vogel (1589–1663) was a German poet and Lutheran minister. Born in Nuremberg, he published an emblem book entitled Meditationes emblematicae de restaurata pace Germaniae, or Emblematic Meditations on the Restored Peace of Germany (1649), designed to convince a wide audience to accept the terms of the Peace of Westphalia.

References

Writers from Nuremberg
1589 births
1663 deaths
17th-century German poets
Lutheran pacifists
17th-century Lutheran clergy